American Light and Traction was founded in 1900 for the purpose for consolidating the utility industry's small, local power suppliers.  By 1901, American Light and Traction owned and controlled over 40 gas producing plants, electric light and traction (streetcar) properties.

History
 1900 - founded by Emerson McMillin as president
 1935 - enactment of Public Utility Holding Act forced break-up of company due to antitrust provisions regulating integrated utility companies
 1938 - Michigan Consolidated Gas (MichCon) formed
 1949 - Michigan Consolidated Gas, the Milwaukee Gas Company, the Michigan-Wisconsin Gas Company, the Austin Field Pipeline Company and the Milwaukee Solvay Company merge to become American Natural Gas Company
 1981 - MichCon becomes wholly owned subsidiary of Primark
 1988 - spun off
 2001 - merger with DTE Energy

External links
 DTE Energy home page
 Money Harvest: Utility Holding Companies Are Threshing Ratepayers

References

Companies based in Birmingham, Alabama
Energy in Alabama 
Defunct electric power companies of the United States
Defunct natural gas companies of the United States
DTE Energy
Companies based in Detroit